The  was a division of the eighth century Japanese government of the Imperial Court in Kyoto, instituted in the Asuka period and formalized during the Heian period.  The Ministry was reorganized in the Meiji period and existed until 1947, before being replaced by the Imperial Household Agency.

Overview
The needs of the Imperial Household has changed over time. The ambit of the Ministry's activities encompassed, for example:
 supervision and maintenance of rice fields for the supply to the imperial family
 oversight of the harvesting done on the Imperial domains
 orchestrating the presentation to the Emperor of rare delicacies as gifts from his subjects
 administration of the culinary and engineering departments of the court
 regulation of breweries
 oversight of the court ladies
 oversight of court smiths
 management of court servants
 oversight of the Imperial wardrobe, etc.
 attending to the imperial princes and princesses of the second to the fourth generation, inclusive

History
When this government agency was initially established in 645, it functioned as a tax collector on Imperial land. The organization and functions of the Imperial Household were refined and regulated in the Taiho Code, which was promulgated in 701-702 during the reign of Emperor Monmu. The fundamental elements of this system evolved over the course of centuries, but the basic structures remained in place until the Meiji Restoration.

This Ministry came to be responsible for everything to do with supporting the Emperor and the Imperial Family. Significant modifications were introduced in 1702, 1870, and 1889. In 1949, the Imperial Household Office became the Imperial Household Agency (the current name), and placed under the fold of the newly created , as an external agency attached to it.

Hierarchy
The court developed a supporting bureaucracy which was exclusively focused on serving the needs of the Imperial Household .  Among the ritsuryō officials within this ministry structure were:

 , the surveyor of all works which are executed within the interior of the palace.
 .
 , two persons.
 , two persons
 , two persons
 
 
 , two positions
 , two positions
 
 
 , two positions
 , two positions
 , An expert who evaluates the price/cost of work to be done or already completed
   see Ōiryō (Bureau of the Palace Kitchen) 
 
 
 
 
 
 , two positions
 , two positions.
 
 
 
 
 
 . No male physician would be permitted to care for the health of the emperor's women
 
 
 
  
 
 
  
 
 
 
 
 .
 
 
 
 
 
 
 
 
 
 
 
 

The deliberate redundancies at the top are features of each position in this remarkably stable hierarchic schema.  Many positions would mirror the -kyō, -taifu, -shō, -jō, and -sakan pattern.

See also
 Daijō-kan

Notes

References
 Kawakami, Karl Kiyoshi. (1903). The Political Ideas of the Modern Japan.  Iowa City, Iowa: University of Iowa Press. OCLC 466275784.   Internet Archive, full text
 Nussbaum, Louis Frédéric and Käthe Roth. (2005). Japan Encyclopedia. Cambridge: Harvard University Press. ; OCLC 48943301
 Titsingh, Isaac. (1834). Nihon Odai Ichiran; ou,  Annales des empereurs du Japon.  Paris: Royal Asiatic Society, Oriental Translation Fund of Great Britain and Ireland.  OCLC 5850691
 Varley, H. Paul. (1980).  Jinnō Shōtōki: A Chronicle of Gods and Sovereigns. New York: Columbia University Press. ;  OCLC 59145842

Government of feudal Japan
Meiji Restoration
Imperial Household
Royal households